Heavy Cream is a compilation album of material recorded by the British rock band Cream from 1966 to 1969.

Although available in other territories as well, the album was largely released to address the North American market, in order for Polydor Records to leverage Cream's back catalogue; prior to 1972, Polydor had licensed Cream's recordings to Atco/Atlantic Records for North American distribution.  Now out of print, Heavy Cream was available as a double album during the years 1972–76, and was briefly reissued by Polydor's affiliated label RSO Records in 1983.

This double album was also issued simultaneously with 3 other double albums of solo material by Eric Clapton, Jack Bruce and Ginger Baker all titled: "... At His Best"

With 22 tracks, Heavy Cream is one of the more comprehensive collections of Cream's work, containing over two-thirds of the band's studio recordings.

Writing for Newsday in 1972, Robert Christgau regarded the album as the best of the Cream compilations up to that point.

The album reached  on the Billboard 200.

Track listing

Personnel

Cream
Jack Bruce – Bass guitar on all tracks except "What a Bringdown", keyboards, vocals; acoustic guitar on "As You Said"; harmonica on "Spoonful", "Rollin' & Tumblin, and "Take It Back"
Eric Clapton – Lead guitar, rhythm guitar on all tracks except "Badge", vocals
Ginger Baker – Drums, percussion, vocals

Additional personnel
Felix Pappalardi – Viola on "White Room" and "Deserted Cities of the Heart"; organ pedals on "Passing the Time"; keyboards on "Badge"; bass guitar on "What a Bringdown"
George Harrison – Rhythm guitar on "Badge"

Citation

1972 compilation albums
Cream (band) compilation albums
Polydor Records compilation albums